Dariusz Fornalak (born 15 October 1965) is a Polish football midfielder and later manager.

References

1965 births
Living people
Polish footballers
Association football midfielders
Poland international footballers
Ruch Chorzów players
GKS Tychy players
Polonia Bytom players
Pogoń Szczecin players
Arka Gdynia players
Ekstraklasa players
I liga players
Polish football managers
Ruch Chorzów managers
Polonia Bytom managers
Zagłębie Lubin managers
Piast Gliwice managers
GKS Katowice managers
Ekstraklasa managers
I liga managers
II liga managers